Kuwait competed at the 1988 Summer Paralympics in Seoul, South Korea. 30 competitors from Kuwait won 17 medals including 5 gold, 5 silver and 7 bronze and finished 25th in the medal table.

See also 
 Kuwait at the Paralympics
 Kuwait at the 1988 Summer Olympics

References 

Kuwait at the Paralympics
1988 in Kuwaiti sport
Nations at the 1988 Summer Paralympics